Microsphecia is a genus of moths in the family Sesiidae.

Species
Microsphecia brosiformis (Hübner, [1808-1813])
Microsphecia tineiformis (Esper, [1789])

References

Sesiidae